Busen Point or Busen Peninsula is a headland forming the southeast side of the entrance to Stromness Bay, on the north coast of South Georgia. It lies on the Lewin Peninsula between Cumberland West Bay and Stromness Bay.

The point was known at a much earlier date, but the name was first used on the charts based upon the 1927–29 survey by Discovery Investigations personnel. It was named for the head of Husvik Harbour in Stromness Bay.

The peninsula between Stromness Bay and Cumberland West Bay, on which Busen Point is found, was named the Lewin Peninsula by the Antarctic Placenames Committee after Terence Lewin, Baron Lewin, who was Chief of Defence Staff and instrumental in directing the campaign to retake South Georgia following the Argentine invasion in 1982.

Three notable rocks lie close northeast of Busen Point of which the outermost is Bucentaur Rock.

See also
Jumbo Cove
Justa Peak

References 

 

Headlands of South Georgia
Subantarctic peninsulas